Flour Bluff Independent School District is a public school district based in Corpus Christi, Texas (USA).

The district serves the Flour Bluff area of Corpus Christi as well as high school students from the London Independent School District.

In 2009, the school district was rated "Recognized" by the Texas Education Agency.

Schools
Flour Bluff High School (Grades 9-12)
Flour Bluff Junior High School (Grades 7-8)
Flour Bluff Intermediate School (Grades 5-6)
Flour Bluff Elementary School (Grades 3-4)
Flour Bluff Primary School (Grades 1-2)
Flour Bluff Early Childhood Center (Grades PK-K)

References

External links
 

School districts in Nueces County, Texas
Education in Corpus Christi, Texas